Silvan Lutz (born 17 October 1990) is a Swiss sprinter specialising in the 400 metres. He won a gold medal in the 4 × 400 metres relay at the 2017 Jeux de la Francophonie. He also competed at two consecutive European Championships.

International competitions

Personal bests

Outdoor
200 metres – 21.25 (-1.6 m/s, Bern 2017)
400 metres – 46.83 (Luzern 2013)
Indoor
200 metres – 22.22 (Magglingen 2009)
400 metres – 47.74 (Magglingen 2017)

References

External links
Official site

1990 births
Living people
Swiss male sprinters
Competitors at the 2017 Summer Universiade